The following articles list Italian football transfers in 2007-08:

List of Italian football transfers 2007-08 (co-ownership)
List of Italian football transfers Summer 2007
List of Italian football transfers Winter 2007-08

Transfers